In combinatorics, tripod packing is a problem of finding many disjoint tripods in a three-dimensional grid, where a tripod is an infinite polycube, the union of the grid cubes along three positive axis-aligned rays with a shared apex.

Several problems of tiling and packing tripods and related shapes were formulated in 1967 by Sherman K. Stein. Stein originally called the tripods of this problem "semicrosses", and they were also called Stein corners by Solomon W. Golomb. A collection of disjoint tripods can be represented compactly as a monotonic matrix, a square matrix whose nonzero entries increase along each row and column and whose equal nonzero entries are placed in a monotonic sequence of cells, and the problem can also be formulated in terms of finding sets of triples satisfying a compatibility condition called "2-comparability", or of finding compatible sets of triangles in a convex polygon.

Equivalent problems
The coordinates  of the apexes of a solution to the tripod problem form a 2-comparable sets of triples, where two triples are defined as being 2-comparable if there are either at least two coordinates where one triple is smaller than the other, or at least two coordinates where one triple is larger than the other. This condition ensures that the tripods defined from these triples do not have intersecting rays.

An array with these properties is called a monotonic matrix. A collection of disjoint tripods with apexes  can be transformed into a monotonic matrix by placing the number  in array cell  and vice versa.

The problem is also equivalent to finding as many triangles as possible among the vertices of a convex polygon, such that no two triangles that share a vertex have nested angles at that vertex. This triangle-counting problem was posed by Peter Braß and its equivalence to tripod packing was observed by Aronov et al.

Lower bounds
It is straightforward to find a solution to the tripod packing problem with  tripods.

are 2-comparable.

After several earlier improvements to this naïve bound, Gowers and Long found solutions to the tripod problem of cardinality .

Upper bounds
There are no other triangles in these graphs (they are locally linear graphs) because any other triangle would lead to a violation of 2-comparability. Although Tiskin writes that "tighter analysis of the parameters" can produce a bound that is less than quadratic by a polylogarithmic factor, he does not supply details and his proof that the number is  uses only the same techniques that are known for the Ruzsa–Szemerédi problem, so this stronger claim appears to be a mistake.

An argument of Dean Hickerson shows that, because tripods cannot pack space with constant density, the same is true for analogous problems in higher dimensions.

Small instances
For small instances of the tripod problem, the exact solution is known.

For instance, the figure shows the 11 tripods that can be packed into a  cube.

References

Packing problems
Unsolved problems in geometry